The Rising Nepal is a Nepalese government-owned daily newspaper published by the Gorkhapatra Sansthan. It is a major English-language daily in Nepal. It is a sister publication of Gorkhapatra, oldest national daily newspaper of Nepal.

History 
The Rising Nepal was established on 16 December 1965 (1 Poush 2022 BS) by the then Panchayat Government. Barun Shumsher Rana served as the founding Chief-Editor. The newspaper was priced 15 paisa. 

The launching copy of the newspaper was discovered in Krishna Bhakta Shrestha, one of the founding reporter's archive in 2021. It was handed over to Madan Puraskar Pustakalaya for archiving. The historical first copy also contains a signature of the then Crown Prince of Nepal Birendra Shah.

References

Daily newspapers published in Nepal
1965 establishments in Nepal
State media